John Bylsma (born 1 February 1946) is an Australian former track cyclist who won a silver medal at the 1966 Commonwealth Games in the 4000 metre individual pursuit. He also competed at the 1968 Summer Olympics and the 1972 Summer Olympics.

Palmarès
Australian Individual Pursuit Champion (Amateur)1965, 1966, 1967, 1968, 1969,1971 & 1972/
Australian Individual Pursuit Champion (Professional) 1973, 1975 
1966:Silver Medalist -Pursuit, Cwlth Games Jamaica
1967: 4th World Championships, Amsterdam
1968: 4th Olympic Games, Mexico
1972: 4th Olympic Games, Munich
1965/1975 Winning member of 7 Australian Teams Pursuit Titles

BEST 4000 metre INDIVIDUAL PURSUIT TIMES

1966 - 4min.59.6 sec. qualifying  round C'Wealth Games Jamaica - Placing Silver Medal

1967 - 4min 59.43sec - qualifying round World Titles - Amsterdam - placing fourth

1968 4min.59.4sec  - qualifying round Australian Titles, Sydney.1st Australian to break 5min in Australia

1968 - 4min.41.1 sec qualifying round Olympic Games Mexico, placing fourth (altitude)

1972 - 4min 53.6sec Final Victorian Titles Australia placing first

1972 =- 4min50.6sec qualifying round Olympic Games, Munich placing fourth

Best  5000 metres pursuit individual 6min.10.6sec. Victorian Titles Australia 19/1/1974 in final Place 1sr

Road Races
1964: 1st Greenvale 100 Kilometre, 
1966: 1st Bendigo to Charlton
1968: 1st Melbourne to Castlemaine, 1st Yea Open, 1st City of Adelaide Criterium,
1970: Fastest Time, Melbourne to Colac
1972: 1st Victorian 100 Kilometre Championship
1974: 1st, Fastest & 150Mile Champion, Melbourne to Warrnambool

References

External links

1946 births
Living people
Australian male cyclists
Cyclists at the 1966 British Empire and Commonwealth Games
Australian people of Dutch descent
Sportspeople from Bundaberg
Cyclists from Queensland
Olympic cyclists of Australia
Cyclists at the 1968 Summer Olympics
Cyclists at the 1972 Summer Olympics
Commonwealth Games medallists in cycling
Commonwealth Games silver medallists for Australia
Medallists at the 1966 British Empire and Commonwealth Games